Lachnocnema angolanus is a butterfly in the family Lycaenidae. It is found in Angola.

References

Endemic fauna of Angola
Butterflies described in 1996
Taxa named by Michel Libert
Miletinae